Vital Balla is a Congolese politician. In 1972 he was included as a member of the Central Committee of the Congolese Party of Labour (PCT), and he remained a member of that body until 1991.

As of 2000, Balla was the second vice-president of the committee appointed to oversee the ceasefire in Brazzaville.

Balla is the president of the Congolese Association for Friendship with the Peoples (ACAP), a position he has held since 1974. As of 1984, he served as vice president of the World Peace Council. In 2010 he was awarded the China-Africa Friendship Award, along with personalities such as Kenneth Kaunda of Zambia. In October 2011, Balla was awarded the Cuban Friendship Medal by ICAP.

References

Congolese Party of Labour politicians
Living people
Year of birth missing (living people)